"With a Smile" is a single by the Eraserheads from their second album Circus & was re-released on their 1998 compilation album Aloha Milkyway.

Music video
The music video, filmed at the Balara Filter in Brgy. Pansol, Quezon City, was directed by Auraeus Solito and was shot in letterboxed 16:9 aspect ratio.

Cover versions
Regine Velasquez recorded her version in 2000 from the movie, Pangako... Ikaw Lang.
South Border covered the song in 2005.
Select GMA Network artists performed the song at the Prosperity in 2010 New Year countdown special on January 1, 2010 to inspire people amidst all the trials of the Philippines in the second half of 2009 (e.g. Death and funeral of Corazon Aquino, Typhoon Ondoy).
Aiza Seguerra also covered the song in 2012.
Christian Renz Padilla performed the song on The X Factor Philippines.
Daniel Padilla recorded his version in 2014.
Janine Berdin performed the song at the Grand Finals, Season 2 of Tawag ng Tanghalan in 2018.
Reese Lansangan recorded her version in 2018 as the theme song for the film Mama's Girl.
Bea Lorenzo recorded her version in 2020 to pay tribute for the modern heroes during the COVID-19 pandemic.
Bright Vachirawit recorded his version of the Eraserheads classic in 2020. His version was used as theme song in the simultaneous airing of Still 2gether in the Philippines exclusively via iWant and Kapamilya Channel.
Lovi Poe recorded her version as the theme song of GMA Network drama series Owe My Love in 2021. Her cover version is also used in Kapuso Mo, Jessica Soho as a background music for paying tribute to comedienne Mahal, who died on August 31, 2021.

References

Eraserheads songs
1994 singles
1994 songs
Rock ballads
Songs written by Ely Buendia
English-language Filipino songs